Álvaro Martín Barreal (born 17 August 2000) is an Argentine professional footballer who plays as a winger for Major League Soccer club FC Cincinnati.

Club career

Vélez Sarsfield
Barreal began his career with Vélez Sarsfield. Gabriel Heinze promoted the midfielder into the club's first-team squad at the beginning of 2018–19, selecting him for his professional debut on 2 September at La Bombonera against Boca Juniors; he was substituted on for Lucas Robertone with thirty-two minutes remaining. He netted his first goal on 3 February 2019 against River Plate.

FC Cincinnati

On 2 September 2020, Barreal signed for Major League Soccer side FC Cincinnati. He signed a three-year contract with a club option for a fourth year. Reports out of Argentina listed the transfer fee in the range of $1.5 to 1.7 million for 75 percent of the player's rights, with Vélez Sarsfield retaining 25 percent of any future sale. Also noted was the potential of $250,000 additional for a set number of appearances. Barreal made his debut on 7 October in a 3–0 defeat away to the Philadelphia Union at Subaru Park, having replaced Frankie Amaya early in the second half. Four further appearances, all as a starter, arrived in his first season with the American club.

International career
Barreal represented the Argentina U20s at the 2018 COTIF Tournament in Spain. He scored two goals in five games, as Argentina won the tournament.

Career statistics

Honours
Argentina U20
 L'Alcúdia International Football Tournament: 2018

References

External links

2000 births
Living people
Footballers from Buenos Aires
Argentine footballers
Argentina youth international footballers
Argentina under-20 international footballers
Association football midfielders
Argentine expatriate footballers
Expatriate soccer players in the United States
Argentine expatriate sportspeople in the United States
Argentine Primera División players
Major League Soccer players
Club Atlético Vélez Sarsfield footballers
FC Cincinnati players